Crab Island may refer to:

United States:
 Crab Island (Florida), a shoal near Destin, Florida
 Crab Island (Lake Champlain), New York
 Crab Island (Washington), one of the San Juan Islands
 Crab Island (West Virginia), on the Ohio River
 A former British name for Vieques, Puerto Rico

Elsewhere:
 Crab Island (Queensland), Australia, in the western Torres Strait
 Crab Island, Guyana, at the mouth of the Berbice River
 Crab Island, Malaysia (Pulau Ketam)

See also
 Crab Cay, Colombia, in the Caribbean Sea
 Crab Key, a fictional Caribbean island in the James Bond novel Dr. No and the film adaptation